"Bye Bye."  (バイバイ。) is a song by Nanase Aikawa from the debut album Red (1996). The track was composed by Tetsurō Oda and released as a single on 7 February 1996. It peaked at number 19 on the Oricon Singles Chart.

The song was released on the greatest hits compilation I.D. and Rock or Die.

Track listings 
"Bye Bye. (バイバイ。)"
"Jounetsu ni Shisu (情熱に死す)"
"Bye Bye. (Original Karaoke) (バイバイ。)"

Jennifer Ellison version 

Jennifer Ellison covered the title track "Bye Bye Boy" in English and released it as a single in 2004. It is her second, and so far, final single. It reached number 13 on the UK charts.

The music video for "Bye Bye Boy" features Ellison and an all-girl rock band. In the video Ellison dances en pointe, as she was a trained ballet dancer who won multiple championships.

In 2006, The song got minimal attention in the United States when music download programs such as Lime Wire and Bear Share would have this song on there, mislogged as Paris Hilton as the performer, fans thinking it is a track on the hotel heiress' debut album.

References

External links 
 Bye Bye. Single 

1996 songs
1996 singles
Japanese-language songs
Jennifer Ellison songs
2004 singles
Songs written by Bill Padley
Songs written by Tetsurō Oda
Year of song missing
Songs written by Jem Godfrey